Velox, is a Latin word meaning "swift" or "rapid". Velox may also refer to:

Vehicles
Heine-Velox, a luxury car made by Gustav Heine
HMS Velox (D34), a British 'V' class destroyer built in 1918
ST Velox, a tugboat in service with D Tripcovich & Co, Italy from 1956-76
Vauxhall 30-98 Velox, a British sports and racing car made between 1913 and 1927
Vauxhall Velox (L-Type), a British medium-sized saloon car between 1948 and 1965
Vickers Velox, a variant of the Vickers Vellore aircraft, also written as Vellox
, an early Czech automobile manufacturer based in Karlín

Sport
Velox (football club), one of the predecessors of the Dutch football club FC Utrecht
Velox Valhallians, a rugby club located in Victoria, British Columbia, on Vancouver Island

Other
Oi Velox, the brand name for Oi's ADSL service
 Velox boiler, a forced-circulation boiler
Velox photographic paper, invented by Leo Baekeland in 1893
Velox (fireboat), a New York City fireboat
Velox (mantis), a genus in family Liturgusidae